The 2019 City of Lincoln Council election took place on 3 May 2019 to elect members of City of Lincoln Council in Lincolnshire, England. This was held on the same day as other local elections. One third 33 seats were up for election, with one councillors in each of the 11 wards being elected.  As the election in 2016 had  been an all-out election with new ward boundaries, the seats of the candidates that had finished second in each ward in the all-out 2016 election were now up for election.

Overall results

|}

Ward results

Abbey

Birchwood

Boultham

Carholme

Castle

Glebe

Hartsholme

Minster

Moorland

Park

Witham

References

2019 English local elections
2019
2010s in Lincolnshire
May 2019 events in the United Kingdom